Toledo is a surname of Spanish origin, after the city of Toledo. Notable people with the surname include:

Historical
Saint Casilda of Toledo (died 1050), Spanish Catholic Saint
Eleonora di Garzia di Toledo (1553–1576), wife of Pietro de' Medici
Eleanor of Toledo (1522–1562), Duchess of Florence, wife of Cosimo I
Fadrique de Toledo (1580-1622), Spanish nobleman and Admiral
Francisco Hernández de Toledo (1514–1587), naturalist and court physician to the King of Spain
Francisco de Toledo, Count of Oropesa (1515–1584), Spanish Viceroy of Peru
Juan Bautista de Toledo (c.1515–1567), Spanish architect
María de Toledo (1490–1549), Vicereine of the Spanish Colony of Santo Domingo
Pedro Álvarez de Toledo, 2nd Marquis of Villafranca (1484–1553) Viceroy of Naples
Pedro de Toledo, 1st Marquis of Mancera (1585–1654), Spanish Viceroy of Peru

Contemporary
Adam Toledo (2007 – 2021), Mexican American boy fatally shot by police
Alejandro Toledo (b. 1946), 63rd President of Peru
Amelia Toledo (1926–2017), Brazilian artist
Antonio Toledo Corro (1919–2018), Mexican politician
Ary Toledo (b. 1937), Brazilian humorist, singer, lyricist and actor
Baldomero Toledo (b. 1970), American football (soccer) referee
Bob Toledo (b. 1946) American college football coach
Francisco Toledo (1940–2019), contemporary Mexican artist
Filipe Toledo (b. 1995), Brazilian professional surfer
Gabriel Toledo, (b. 1991), known as FalleN, Brazilian Counter-Strike player
Goya Toledo (b. 1969), Spanish actress and model
Guillermo Toledo (b. 1970), Spanish actor, producer and political activist
Hernán Toledo (b. 1996), Argentinian football (soccer) player
Isabel Toledo (1961–2019), Cuban-American fashion designer
Javier Toledo (b. 1986), Argentinian football (soccer) player
Jose Victor Toledo (1931–1980), American federal judge
Juan Pedro Toledo (b. 1978), Mexican sprint athlete
Klebber Toledo (b. 1986), Brazilian actor and model
Mario Monteforte Toledo (1911–2003), Guatemalan writer and politician
Mirta Toledo (b. 1952), Argentinian artist
Natalia Toledo (b. 1968), Mexican poet
Natalia Toledo (athlete) (b. 1972), Paraguayan track & field athlete
Patricia Toledo (b. 1978), Brazilian football (soccer) player
Rafael Toledo (b. 1980), Brazilian football (soccer) player
Robson Toledo (b. 1981), Brazilian football (soccer) player
Víctor Manuel Toledo (b. 1945), Mexican biologist and politician
Will Toledo, (b. 1993), American singer/songwriter, frontman of Car Seat Headrest

Spanish-language surnames
Spanish toponymic surnames